Novoplectron is a genus of cave wētā in the family Rhaphidophoridae, endemic to offshore islands of New Zealand.

Species
 Novoplectron serratum Hutton, 1897

References

 Peripatus

Ensifera genera
Cave weta